River City Church is a Baptist church in Minneapolis, Minnesota, member of the Venture Church Network.

History
It was founded in 1853 at Saint Anthony Falls by E.W. Cressey, a missionary with the American Baptist Home Mission Society, together with members of First Baptist Church of Saint Paul and St. Anthony gathered on March 5, 1853 and committed themselves to organizing a "Regular Baptist Church," the first Church organized in Minnesota Territory west of the Mississippi River.

The first permanent home for the Church was at Third and Nicollet, and was the largest meeting hall in Minneapolis. With the rapid growth of the city a larger building was built at 5th and Hennepin in 1857. In 1871 a group of Swedish attendees at First Baptist Church formed Bethlehem Baptist Church (Minneapolis). A new building was inaugurated in 1885 at 10th street and Hennepin avenue.  The building was designed by the firm of Kees and Fisk, which later became the firm of Long and Kees.  It is built of Kasota limestone in a blend of the Romanesque and Gothic revival styles.  The original steeples were blown down in a 1967 windstorm.

William Bell Riley, an American Baptist evangelical Christian, served as pastor of the church for forty-five years (1897–1942) and another five as pastor emeritus until his death in 1947. He also founded the Northwestern Bible Training School along with an Evangelical Seminary, now known as University of Northwestern - St. Paul.

In 2020, the church announced that they would be changing their name to "River City Church".

In 2022, the church sold his building to Eagle Brook Church and moved to 11th Avenue.

References

External links

 Official website

Churches in Minneapolis
Baptist churches in Minnesota